Fisheries Museum or Fishing Museum may refer to:

 Brighton Fishing Museum
Destin History & Fishing Museum
 Fisheries and Maritime Museum, Esbjerg
German Hunting and Fishing Museum
 
 Fishing Museum, Palamós
North Shore Commercial Fishing Museum
Sebastian Fishing Museum
 Scottish Fisheries Museum

See also

Fishing museums